Dorf in German translates to "village", and -dorf is a common suffix in place names in Germany, Austria, and Switzerland.

Dorf, Germany may refer to:

 Dorf (Bayrischzell), part of the municipality of Bayrischzell, Miesbach, Bayern
 Dorf (Bernau im Schwarzwald), part of the municipality of Bernau im Schwarzwald, Waldshut, Baden-Württemberg
 Dorf (Biederbach), part of the municipality of Biederbach, Emmendingen, Baden-Württemberg
 Dorf (Engelsberg), part of the municipality of Engelsberg, Traunstein, Bayern
 Dorf (Ering), part of the municipality of Ering, Rottal-Inn, Bayern
 Dorf (Fürstenzell), part of the town of Fürstenzell, Passau, Bayern
 Dorf (Künzing), part of the municipality of Künzing, Deggendorf, Bayern
 Dorf (Oberstdorf), part of the town of Oberstdorf, Oberallgäu, Bayern
 Dorf (Pfronten), part of the municipality of Pfronten, Ostallgäu, Bayern
 Dorf (Schmelz), part of the municipality of Schmelz, Saarlouis, Saarland
 Dorf (Seeon-Seebruck), part of the municipality of Seeon-Seebruck, Traunstein, Bayern
 Dorf (Vilshofen), part of the municipality of Vilshofen, Passau, Bayern
 Dorf (Wittlich), part of the town of Wittlich, Bernkastel-Wittlich, Rheinland-Pfalz